Macrocnemum is a genus of plant in the family Rubiaceae. It contains the following species (but this list may be incomplete):
 Macrocnemum cinchonoides (Wedd.) Wedd.
 Macrocnemum jamaicense L.
 Macrocnemum pilosinervium Standl.

References 

 

 
Rubiaceae genera
Taxonomy articles created by Polbot